Olyutor Peninsula is a peninsula in Kamchatka Krai, Russian Federation. The nearest town is Tilichiki, Olyutorsky District.

The peninsula is named after the Olyutor people, the ancient inhabitants of the area.

Geography 
The Olyutor Peninsula is the southern extremity of the Olyutor Range, jutting southwards with the Olyutor Gulf to the west and the Bering Sea to the east. The southern end of the peninsula is Cape Olyutor (Mys Olyutorsky).
The peninsula and its attached mountain range to the north are a mainland prolongation of the submerged Shirshov Ridge of the Bering Sea.

References

Peninsulas of Russia
Landforms of Kamchatka Krai
Koryak Mountains